

Events

Pre-1600
38 – Drusilla, Caligula's sister who died in June, with whom the emperor is said to have an incestuous relationship, is deified. 
1122 – Pope Callixtus II and Holy Roman Emperor Henry V agree to the Concordat of Worms to put an end to the Investiture Controversy.
1338 – The Battle of Arnemuiden, in which a French force defeats the English, is the first naval battle of the Hundred Years' War and the first naval battle in which gunpowder artillery is used.
1409 – The Battle of Kherlen is the second significant victory over Ming dynasty China by the Mongols since 1368.
1459 – The Battle of Blore Heath, the first major battle of the English Wars of the Roses, is won by the Yorkists.
1561 – King Philip II of Spain issues cedula, ordering a halt to colonizing efforts in Florida.

1601–1900
1803 – Second Anglo-Maratha War: The Battle of Assaye is fought between the British East India Company and the Maratha Empire in India. 
1821 – Tripolitsa, Greece, is captured by Greek rebels during the Greek War of Independence.
1846 – Astronomers Urbain Le Verrier, John Couch Adams and Johann Gottfried Galle collaborate on the discovery of Neptune.
1868 – The Grito de Lares occurs in Puerto Rico against Spanish rule.
1884 – On the night of 23-24 September, the steamship Arctique runs aground near Cape Virgenes leading to the discovery of nearby placer gold, beginning the Tierra del Fuego gold rush. 
1899 – The American Asiatic Squadron destroys a Filipino battery at the Battle of Olongapo.

1901–present
1905 – Norway and Sweden sign the Karlstad Treaty, peacefully dissolving the Union between the two countries.
1942 – World War II: The Matanikau action on Guadalcanal begins: U.S. Marines attack Japanese units along the Matanikau River.
1950 – Korean War: The Battle of Hill 282 is the first US friendly-fire incident on British military personnel since World War II.
1973 – Argentine general election: Juan Perón returns to power in Argentina.
1983 – Gulf Air Flight 771 is destroyed by a bomb, killing all 117 people on board.
2004 – Over 3,000 people die in Haiti after Hurricane Jeanne produces massive flooding and mudslides.
2008 – Matti Saari kills ten people at a school in Finland before committing suicide.

Births

Pre-1600
63 BC – Augustus, Roman emperor (d. 14 AD)
1158 – Geoffrey II, Duke of Brittany (d. 1186)
1215 – Kublai Khan, Mongolian emperor (d. 1294)
1495 – Bagrat III of Imereti, King of Imereti (d. 1565)
1597 – Francesco Barberini, Catholic cardinal (d. 1679)
1598 – Eleonore Gonzaga, Italian wife of Ferdinand II, Holy Roman Emperor (d. 1655)

1601–1900
1642 – Giovanni Maria Bononcini, Italian violinist and composer (d. 1678)
1647 – Joseph Dudley, English politician, Governor of the Province of Massachusetts Bay (d. 1720)
1650 – Jeremy Collier, English bishop and theologian (d. 1726)
1713 – Ferdinand VI of Spain (d. 1759)
1740 – Empress Go-Sakuramachi of Japan (d. 1813)
1756 – John Loudon McAdam, Scottish engineer (d. 1836)
1771 – Emperor Kōkaku of Japan (d. 1840)
1778 – Mariano Moreno, Argentinian journalist, lawyer, and politician (d. 1811)
1781 – Princess Juliane of Saxe-Coburg-Saalfeld (d. 1860)
1791 – Johann Franz Encke, German astronomer and academic (d. 1865)
  1791   – Theodor Körner, German soldier and author (d. 1813)
1800 – William Holmes McGuffey, American author and academic (d. 1873)
1819 – Hippolyte Fizeau, French physicist and academic (d. 1896)
1823 – John Colton, English-Australian politician, 13th Premier of South Australia (d. 1902)
1838 – Victoria Woodhull, American journalist and activist (d. 1927)
1851 – Ellen Hayes, American mathematician and astronomer (d. 1930)
1852 – James Carroll Beckwith, American painter and academic (d. 1917)
  1852   – William Stewart Halsted, American physician and surgeon (d. 1922)
1853 – Princess Marie Elisabeth of Saxe-Meiningen (d. 1923)
1861 – Robert Bosch, German engineer and businessman, founded Robert Bosch GmbH (d. 1942)
1863 – Mary Church Terrell, American author and activist (d. 1954)
1865 – Pekka Halonen, Finnish painter (d. 1933)
  1865   – Emma Orczy, Hungarian-English author and playwright (d. 1947)
  1865   – Suzanne Valadon, French model and painter (d. 1938)
1867 – John Lomax, American teacher, musicologist, and folklorist (d. 1948)
1876 – Moshe Zvi Segal, Israeli rabbi and scholar (d. 1968)
1880 – John Boyd Orr, 1st Baron Boyd-Orr, Scottish biologist, physician, and politician, Nobel Prize laureate (d. 1971)
1889 – Walter Lippmann, American journalist and publisher, co-founded The New Republic (d. 1974)
1890 – Friedrich Paulus, German general (d. 1957)
1895 – Miron Merzhanov, Russian architect and engineer (d. 1975)
  1895   – Johnny Mokan, American baseball player (d. 1985)
1897 – Paul Delvaux, Belgian painter (d. 1994)
  1897   – Walter Pidgeon, Canadian-American actor and singer (d. 1984)
1898 – Les Haylen, Australian journalist and politician (d. 1977)
1899 – Tom C. Clark, American lawyer and judge, 59th Attorney General of the United States (d. 1977)
  1899   – Louise Nevelson, American sculptor (d. 1988)
1900 – Bill Stone, English soldier (d. 2009)

1901–present
1901 – Jaroslav Seifert, Czech poet and journalist, Nobel Prize laureate (d. 1986)
1902 – Su Buqing, Chinese mathematician and academic (d. 2003)
1903 – Cec Fifield, Australian rugby league player and coach (d. 1957)
1904 – Arthur Folwell, English-Australian rugby league player, coach, and administrator (d. 1966)
1906 – Charles Ritchie, Canadian diplomat, High Commission of Canada to the United Kingdom (d. 1995)
1907 – Tiny Bradshaw, American singer-songwriter and pianist (d. 1958)
  1907   – Anne Desclos, French journalist and author (d. 1998)
  1907   – Duarte Nuno, Duke of Braganza (d. 1976)
1908 – Ramdhari Singh Dinkar, Indian poet, academic, and politician (d. 1974)
1909 – Lorenc Antoni, Kosovo-Albanian composer and conductor (d. 1991)
1910 – Jakob Streit, Swiss anthroposophist and author (d. 2009)
1911 – Frank Moss, American lawyer and politician (d. 2003)
1912 – Ghulam Mustafa Khan, Pakistani linguist, author, and critic (d. 2005)
  1912   – Tony Smith, American sculptor and educator (d. 1980)
1913 – Carl-Henning Pedersen, Danish painter and sculptor (d. 2007)
1915 – Julius Baker, American flute player and educator (d. 2003)
  1915   – Clifford Shull, American physicist and academic, Nobel Prize laureate (d. 2001)
1916 – Aldo Moro, Italian academic and politician, 39th Prime Minister of Italy (d. 1978)
1917 – Santo, Mexican Luchador enmascarado, film actor, and folk icon (d. 1984)
  1917   – Asima Chatterjee, Indian chemist (d. 2006)
1920 – Mickey Rooney, American actor, singer, director, and producer (d. 2014)
1923 – Mohamed Hassanein Heikal, Egyptian journalist (d. 2016)
  1923   – Vello Helk, Estonian-Danish historian and author (d. 2014)
1924 – Pedro Joaquín Chamorro Cardenal, Nicaraguan journalist and publisher (d. 1978)
1925 – Denis C. Twitchett, English historian and scholar (d. 2006)
1926 – André Cassagnes, French toy maker, created the Etch A Sketch (d. 2013)
  1926   – John Coltrane, American saxophonist and composer  (d. 1967)
1928 – Frank Foster, American saxophonist and composer (d. 2011)
1928 - Jim French, American radio personality, radio producer, and video game voice actor (d. 2017)
  1928   – Roger Grimsby, American journalist and actor (d. 1995)
1930 – Sehba Akhtar, Pakistani poet and songwriter (d. 1996)
  1930   – Colin Blakely, Northern Irish actor (d. 1987)
  1930   – Ray Charles, American singer-songwriter, pianist, and actor (d. 2004)
1931 – Hilly Kristal, American businessman, founded CBGB (d. 2007)
  1931   – Stan Lynde, American author and illustrator (d. 2013)
  1931   – Gerald Merrithew, Canadian educator and politician (d. 2004)
1932 – Georg Keßler, German footballer and manager
1933 – Lloyd J. Old, American immunologist and academic (d. 2011)
1934 – Per Olov Enquist, Swedish journalist, author, and playwright (d. 2020)
1935 – Prem Chopra, Pakistani-Indian actor
  1935   – Les McCann, American soul-jazz singer and pianist
  1935   – Ron Tindall, English-Australian footballer, cricketer, and manager (d. 2012)
1936 – George Eastham, English footballer
  1936   – Valentín Paniagua, Peruvian lawyer and politician, 91st President of Peru (d. 2006)
  1936   – Sylvain Saudan, Swiss skier
  1936   – Tareq Suheimat, Jordanian physician, general, and politician (d. 2014)
1937 – Jacques Poulin, Canadian author and translator
1938 – Romy Schneider, German-French actress (d. 1982)
1939 – Henry Blofeld, English cricketer and journalist
  1939   – Roy Buchanan, American singer-songwriter and guitarist (d. 1988)
  1939   – Joan Hanham, Baroness Hanham, English politician
  1939   – Sonny Vaccaro, American businessman
1940 – Michel Temer, Brazilian lawyer and politician, 25th Vice President of Brazil
  1940   – Dick Thornett, Australian rugby player and water polo player (d. 2011)
1941 – George Jackson, American activist and author, co-founded the Black Guerrilla Family (d. 1971)
  1941   – Simon Nolet, Canadian ice hockey player and coach
  1941   – Norma Winstone, English singer-songwriter
1942 – Sila María Calderón, Puerto Rican-American businesswoman and politician, 12th Secretary of State of Puerto Rico
  1942   – Colin Low, Baron Low of Dalston, Scottish scholar and politician
  1942   – David Renneberg, Australian cricketer
1943 – Julio Iglesias, Spanish singer-songwriter
  1943   – Marty Schottenheimer, American football player and coach (d. 2021)
1944 – Eric Bogle, Scottish-Australian singer-songwriter and guitarist
1945 – Igor Ivanov, Russian politician and diplomat, Russian Minister of Foreign Affairs
  1945   – Alan Old, English rugby player
1946 – Franz Fischler, Austrian politician
  1946   – Bernard Maris, French economist and journalist (d. 2015)
  1946   – Genista McIntosh, Baroness McIntosh, English politician
  1946   – Davorin Popović, Bosnian singer-songwriter (d. 2001)
  1946   – Anne Wheeler, Canadian director, producer, and screenwriter
1947 – Christian Bordeleau, Canadian ice hockey player
  1947   – Mary Kay Place, American actress
  1947   – Neal Smith, American drummer and songwriter 
1948 – Dan Toler, American guitarist (d. 2013)
1949 – Floella Benjamin, Trinidadian-English actress, academic, and politician
  1949   – Bruce Springsteen, American singer-songwriter and guitarist 
  1949   – Kostas Tournas, Greek singer-songwriter
1950 – George Garzone, American saxophonist and educator
1951 – Steven Springer, American guitarist and songwriter (d. 2012)
1952 – Mark Bego, American author
  1952   – Anshuman Gaekwad, Indian cricketer
  1952   – Dennis Lamp, American baseball player
  1952   – Jim Morrison, American baseball player and manager
1953 – Nicholas Witchell, English journalist
1954 – Charlie Barnett, American actor (d. 1996)
  1954   – Cherie Blair, English lawyer and academic
1956 – Peter David, American author, actor, and screenwriter
  1956   – Tom Hogan, Australian cricketer
  1956   – Paolo Rossi, Italian footballer (d. 2020)
1957 – Rosalind Chao, American actress
1958 – Danielle Dax, English singer-songwriter and producer 
  1958   – Khaled El Sheikh, Bahraini singer-songwriter
  1958   – Tony Fossas, Cuban-American baseball player and coach
  1958   – Marvin Lewis, American football player and coach
  1958   – Larry Mize, American golfer
1959 – Jason Alexander, American actor, singer, and voice artist
  1959   – Frank Cottrell-Boyce, English author and screenwriter
  1959   – Hans Nijman, Dutch mixed martial artist and wrestler (d. 2014)
  1959   – Chris O'Sullivan, Australian rugby league player
  1959   – Elizabeth Peña, American actress (d. 2014)
  1959   – Karen Pierce, English diplomat
1960 – Kurt Beyer, American wrestler
  1960   – Luis Moya, Spanish race car driver
1961 – Chi McBride, American actor 
  1961   – William C. McCool, American commander, pilot, and astronaut (d. 2003)
1962 – Deborah Orr, Scottish journalist (d. 2019)
1963 – Anne-Marie Cadieux, Canadian actress, director, and screenwriter
  1963   – Alex Proyas, Egyptian-Australian director, producer, and screenwriter
1964 – Clayton Blackmore, Welsh footballer and manager
  1964   – Josefa Idem, German-born Italian kayaker
  1964   – Koshi Inaba, Japanese singer-songwriter
  1964   – Larry Krystkowiak, American basketball player and coach
  1964   – Katie Mitchell, English director and producer
  1964   – Julian Parkhill, English biologist and academic
  1964   – Bill Phillips, American businessman and author
1965 – Mark Woodforde, Australian tennis player and sportscaster
1966 – Pete Harnisch, American baseball player and coach
1967 – Chris Wilder, English footballer and manager
1968 – Yvette Fielding, English actress and producer
  1968   – Adam Price, Welsh politician
1969 – Donald Audette, Canadian ice hockey player
  1969   – Patrick Fiori, French singer-songwriter
  1969   – Jan Suchopárek, Czech footballer and manager
1970 – Adrian Brunker, Australian rugby player
  1970   – Lucia Cifarelli, American singer-songwriter and keyboard player 
  1970   – Ani DiFranco, American singer-songwriter and guitarist
  1970   – Giorgos Koltsidas, Greek footballer
1971 – Moin Khan, Pakistani cricketer and coach
  1971   – Eric Montross, American basketball player and sportscaster
  1971   – Sean Spicer, 30th White House Press Secretary
1972 – Sam Bettens, Belgian singer-songwriter and guitarist 
  1972   – Alistair Campbell, Zimbabwean cricketer
  1972   – Jermaine Dupri, American rapper and producer
  1972   – Karl Pilkington, English actor and producer
1973 – Ingrid Fliter, Argentinian pianist
  1973   – Vangelis Krios, Greek footballer and coach
1974 – Ben Duckworth, Australian rugby league player
  1974   – Matt Hardy, American wrestler
1975 – Layzie Bone, American rapper 
  1975   – Kim Dong-moon, South Korean badminton player
  1975   – Chris Hawkins, English journalist and producer
  1975   – Eric Miller, Irish rugby player, footballer, and coach
1976 – Sarah Blasko, Australian singer-songwriter and producer
  1976   – Robert James-Collier, English actor
  1976   – Valeriy Sydorenko, Ukrainian boxer
  1976   – Volodymyr Sydorenko, Ukrainian boxer
1977 – Matthieu Descoteaux, Canadian ice hockey player
  1977   – Dmitri Kulikov, Estonian footballer
  1977   – Fabio Ongaro, Italian rugby player
  1977   – Rachael Yamagata, American singer-songwriter and pianist
1978 – Benjamin Curtis, American guitarist, drummer, and songwriter (d. 2013)
  1978   – Anthony Mackie, American actor
1979 – Ricky Davis, American basketball player
  1979   – Bryant McKinnie, American football player
  1979   – Fábio Simplício, Brazilian footballer
  1979   – Lote Tuqiri, Fijian-Australian rugby player
1981 – Robert Doornbos, Dutch racing driver
  1981   – Helen Richardson-Walsh, English field hockey player
1982 – Mait Künnap, Estonian tennis player
  1982   – Shyla Stylez, Canadian pornographic actress (d. 2017)
1983 – Shane del Rosario, American mixed martial artist and kick-boxer (d. 2013)
  1983   – Joffrey Lupul, Canadian ice hockey player
1984 – Patrick Ehelechner, German ice hockey player
  1984   – Matt Kemp, American baseball player
  1984   – Anneliese van der Pol, Dutch-American entertainer 
1985 – Lukáš Kašpar, Czech ice hockey player
1986 – Martin Cranie, English footballer
1988 – Juan Martín del Potro, Argentinian tennis player
  1988   – Yannick Weber, Swiss ice hockey player
1989 – Brandon Jennings, American basketball player
  1989   – Taniela Lasalo, Australian rugby league player
1991 – Lee Alexander, Scottish footballer
1991   – Kim Ki-bum, South Korean singer and entertainer
  1991   – Melanie Oudin, American tennis player
1994 – Lee Mi-joo, South Korean singer and entertainer
1999 – Song Yu-qi, Chinese singer

Deaths

Pre-1600
 788 – Ælfwald I, king of Northumbria
 965 – Al-Mutanabbi, Arab poet (b. 915)
1193 – Robert de Sablé, French knight
1241 – Snorri Sturluson, Icelandic historian, poet, and politician (b. 1178)
1253 – Wenceslaus I of Bohemia
1267 – Beatrice of Provence, countess regnant of Provence (b. 1234)
1386 – Dan I of Wallachia
1390 – John I, Duke of Lorraine (b. 1346)
1448 – Adolph I, Duke of Cleves (b. 1373)
1461 – Charles, Prince of Viana, King of Navarre (b. 1421)
1508 – Beatrice of Naples, queen consort of Hungary (b. 1457)
1535 – Catherine of Saxe-Lauenburg (b. 1513)
1571 – John Jewel, English bishop (b. 1522)
1573 – Azai Hisamasa, Japanese warlord (b. 1524)

1601–1900
1605 – Pontus de Tyard, French priest and poet (b. 1521)
1675 – Valentin Conrart, French author, founded the Académie française (b. 1603)
1728 – Christian Thomasius, German jurist and philosopher (b. 1655)
1738 – Herman Boerhaave, Dutch botanist and physician (b. 1668)
1764 – Robert Dodsley, English poet and playwright (b. 1703)
1773 – Johan Ernst Gunnerus, Norwegian bishop and botanist (b. 1718)
1789 – John Rogers, American lawyer and politician (b. 1723)
1835 – Vincenzo Bellini, Italian composer (b. 1801)
1851 – Émilie Gamelin, Canadian nun, founded the Sisters of Providence (b. 1800)
1846 – John Ainsworth Horrocks, English-Australian explorer (b. 1818)
1850 – José Gervasio Artigas, Uruguayan general and politician (b. 1764)
1870 – Prosper Mérimée, French archaeologist and historian (b. 1803)
1871 – Louis-Joseph Papineau, Canadian lawyer and politician (b. 1786)
1873 – Jean Chacornac, French astronomer (b. 1823)
1877 – Urbain Le Verrier, French mathematician and astronomer (b. 1811)
1889 – Wilkie Collins, English novelist, short story writer, and playwright (b. 1824)
1896 – Emmanuel Benner, French artist (b. 1836)
1900 – William Marsh Rice, American businessman, founded Rice University (b. 1816)

1901–present
1913 – Donato Álvarez, Argentinian general (b. 1825)
1917 – Werner Voss, German lieutenant and pilot (b. 1897)
1929 – Richard Adolf Zsigmondy, Austrian-German chemist, physicist, and academic, Nobel Prize laureate (b. 1865)
1939 – Sigmund Freud, Austrian neurologist and psychiatrist (b. 1856)
  1939   – Francisco León de la Barra, Mexican politician and diplomat, interim president, 1911 (b. 1863)
1940 – Hale Holden, American businessman (b. 1869)
1943 – Elinor Glyn, English author, screenwriter, and producer (b. 1864)
1944 – Jakob Schaffner, Swiss author and critic (b. 1875)
1950 – Sam Barry, American basketball player and coach (b. 1892)
1958 – Jacob Nicol, Canadian publisher, lawyer, and politician (b. 1876)
1967 – Stanislaus Zbyszko, Polish wrestler and strongman (b. 1879)
1968 – Pio of Pietrelcina, Italian priest and saint (b. 1887)
1971 – James Waddell Alexander II, American mathematician and topologist (b. 1888)
1973 – Pablo Neruda, Chilean poet and diplomat, Nobel Prize laureate (b. 1904)
1974 – Cliff Arquette, American actor and comedian (b. 1905)
  1974   – Robbie McIntosh, Scottish drummer (b. 1950)
1978 – Lyman Bostock, American baseball player (b. 1950)
1979 – Catherine Lacey, English actress (b. 1904)
1981 – Chief Dan George, Canadian actor, author, and poet (b. 1899)
1987 – Bob Fosse, American actor, dancer, choreographer, and director (b. 1927)
1988 – Tibor Sekelj, Hungarian-Serbian explorer and author (b. 1912)
1992 – Ivar Ivask, Estonian poet and scholar (b. 1927)
  1992   – Glendon Swarthout, American author and academic (b. 1918)
  1992   – James Van Fleet, American general (b. 1892)
1994 – Jerry Barber, American golfer (b. 1916)
  1994   – Robert Bloch, American author and screenwriter (b. 1917)
  1994   – Madeleine Renaud, French actress (b. 1900)
1997 – Natalie Savage Carlson, American author (b. 1906)
1998 – Ray Bowden, English footballer (b. 1909)
  1998   – Mary Frann, American actress (b. 1943)
1999 – Ivan Goff, Australian-American screenwriter and producer (b. 1910)
2000 – Aurelio Rodríguez, Mexican baseball player and manager (b. 1947)
  2000   – Carl Rowan, American journalist and author (b. 1925)
  2000   – Raoul Berger, American attorney and law professor (b. 1901)
2001 – Ron Hewitt, Welsh footballer (b. 1928)
2003 – Yuri Senkevich, Russian physician and journalist (b. 1937)
2004 – Billy Reay, Canadian-American ice hockey player and coach (b. 1918)
2005 – Filiberto Ojeda Ríos, Puerto Rican activist (b. 1933)
2006 – Malcolm Arnold, English trumpet player and composer (b. 1921)
  2006   – Etta Baker, American singer and guitarist (b. 1913)
2008 – Peter Leonard, Australian journalist (b. 1942)
  2008   – Loren Pope, American journalist and author (b. 1910)
2009 – Paul B. Fay, American sailor and politician, United States Secretary of the Navy (b. 1918)
2010 – Malcolm Douglas, Australian hunter and television host (b. 1941)
2012 – Henry Champ, Canadian journalist and academic (b. 1937)
  2012   – Pavel Grachev, Russian general and politician, 1st Minister of Defence for Russia (b. 1948)
  2012   – Roberto Rodríguez, Venezuelan baseball player and coach (b. 1941)
  2012   – Corrie Sanders, South African boxer (b. 1966)
  2012   – Sam Sniderman, Canadian businessman, founded Sam the Record Man (b. 1920)
2013 – Abdel Hamid al-Sarraj, Syrian colonel and politician (b. 1925)
  2013   – Gil Dozier, American captain, lawyer, and politician (b. 1934)
  2013   – Ruth Patrick, American botanist and immunologist (b. 1907)
2014 – A. W. Davis, American basketball player and coach (b. 1943)
  2014   – Irven DeVore, American anthropologist and biologist (b. 1934)
  2014   – Don Manoukian, American football player and wrestler (b. 1934)
  2014   – Al Suomi, American ice hockey player and referee (b. 1913)
2015 – Dayananda Saraswati, Indian monk and philosopher (b. 1930)
2018 – Charles Kuen Kao, Hong Kong-American-British electrical engineer and physicist (b. 1933)
  2018   – Gary Kurtz, American film producer (b. 1940)
  2018   – Jane Fortune, American author, journalist, and philanthropist (b.1942)
2020 – Juliette Gréco,  French singer and actress (b. 1927)
2021 – John Elliott, Australian businessman (b. 1941)
  2021   – Nino Vaccarella, Italian race car driver (b. 1933)

Holidays and observances
Christian feast day:
Adomnán
Cissa of Crowland (or of Northumbria)
Padre Pio
Pope Linus
Sossius
Thecla (Roman Catholic Church)
Xanthippe and Polyxena
September 23 (Eastern Orthodox liturgics)
Grito de Lares (Puerto Rico)
Holocaust Memorial Day (Lithuania)
Kyrgyz Language Day (Kyrgyzstan)
National Day (Saudi Arabia) 
Teachers' Day (Brunei)
Celebrate Bisexuality Day (bisexual community)
International Day of Sign Languages

References

External links

 
 
 

Days of the year
September